Sarkhun (also Romanized as Sarkhūn; also known as Sarkhoom and Shahru) is a village in Sarkhun Rural District, Qaleh Qazi District, Bandar Abbas County, Hormozgan Province, Iran. At the 2006 census, its population was 3,870, in 896 families.

References 

Populated places in Bandar Abbas County